is the second live-action television adaptation of the novel of the same name. It aired as a five-episode Japanese television live-action TV series broadcast on Fuji Television between February 19 and March 19, 1994, directed by Masayuki Ochiai and Yūichi Satō, with screenplay by Ryōichi Kimizuka and music by Joe Hisaishi. It stars the then-rookie idol Yuki Uchida in the main role, and also features the writer of the original book, Yasutaka Tsutsui, and the then-unknown idols Miho Kanno (the first Tomie), Ranran Suzuki and her then-rabbit-cosplayed-partner in the children TV show Ponkikies: future J-pop star Namie Amuro.

Cast
Yuki Uchida as Kazuko Yoshiyama
Yoshihiko Hakamada as Kazuo Fukamachi
Gamon Kaai as Gorō Asakura
Ranran Suzuki as Mariko Kanda
Miho Kanno
Leo Morimoto
Namie Amuro
Yasutaka Tsutsui
Kyoko Yoshizawa
B-saku Sato
Yoko Moriguchi

References

1994 Japanese television series debuts
Japanese science fiction television series
1994 Japanese television series endings
Television shows based on Japanese novels
Fuji TV original programming
The Girl Who Leapt Through Time